Abingdon School Boat Club is the rowing club for Abingdon School. The club has a strong tradition of providing rowers for the Oxford University Boat Club, Cambridge University Boat Club and international teams.

History
The boat club has a long history with the first documentary evidence of rowing as a school activity in 1830. Roysse's School Rowing Club (1840) became Abingdon School Boat Club.

Originally the club rowed in the Abingdon Town Regatta before creating the School Regatta in the 1890s following the discontinuation of the former. The principal event was the race between the first four and an Old Abingdonians (OAs) crew. Although the school had raced informally against Radley College the first official race with another school was on 5 July 1902 when the first four competed against St. Mark's School of Windsor. In 1936 the school entered the Marlow Regatta for the first time and won their first event at the Wallingford Regatta in 1952.

In 1953 a new boathouse was built before a maiden win at the Marlow Regatta in 1955 and a first appearance at the Henley Royal Regatta in 1960. In 1982 the club won 25 trophies followed by 31 in 1984 and in 1985 was listed as the most successful school rowing club in the country. In 1991 both the coxed fours and coxless fours became National Champions with the coxed four later representing England. Since 1991 Abingdon School has been represented at English or British junior international level every season.

The 1st VIII won the "triple" in 2002 and again in 2012: the Schools' Head of the River Race, the Queen Mother's Cup at the National Schools' Regatta and the Princess Elizabeth Challenge Cup at Henley Royal Regatta. 2006's J14's A and B squads both became National School Champions, whilst the 2007 J16's won the junior Inter-Regionals 8+ event, and a J16 4+ crew went to form half the winning GB 8+ in the GB-France match. In 2009 the 1st VIII reached the final of the Henley Royal Regatta before losing to a "triple" winning Eton College crew.

In 2011 the 1st VIII achieved victory again at the Schools Head of the River. They backed this up by winning the Princess Elizabeth Cup at Henley Royal Regatta, on the way setting a new record of 6:19 for the course in the semi-final against Radley College, beating the long-standing record set by Pangbourne College in 1992 of 6:22. The 1st VIII won the Princess Elizabeth Cup in 2012 and 2013 too, setting a new course record in the 2013 final of 6:17.  The last time a school won the cup for three consecutive years was Bedford School in 1948.

With four Henley Royal Regatta wins to its name, the school has become one of the most successful rowing schools in the UK.

In 2016 and 2017 the school has provided a total of six members for the University boat race, (four for Oxford and two for Cambridge).

Notable rowers

Junior internationals
Below is a list of Junior Internationals capped by either Great Britain at the Coupe de la Jeunesse or England.

Coaches
The school has an impressive history of top-level coaches that have instrumented the continued success of the Boat Club and its athletes, to the tune of multiple national and Henley Royal Regatta titles, including "the triple" in 2002 and 2012 - a prestigious achievement which comprises winning the Schools' Head of the River Race, Championship eights at the National Schools' Regatta and finally the Princess Elizabeth Challenge Cup at Henley Royal Regatta, all in the same year.

Key

See also
 List of Old Abingdonians

References

1830 establishments in England
Sports clubs established in 1830
Rowing clubs in England
 
Rowing clubs of the River Thames
Buildings and structures on the River Thames
Rowing clubs in Oxfordshire
Scholastic rowing in the United Kingdom